Jagodno may refer to the following places:
Jagodno, Greater Poland Voivodeship (west-central Poland)
Jagodno, Lublin Voivodeship (east Poland)
Jagodno, Masovian Voivodeship (east-central Poland)
Jagodno, Warmian-Masurian Voivodeship (north Poland)
 Jagodno, Croatia, a village near Velika Gorica, Croatia